
This is a list of aircraft in alphabetical order beginning with 'Tl'.

Tl

TL Ultralight 
(TL Ultralight, Hradec Králové)
 TL Ultralight TL-22 Duo
 TL Ultralight TL-32 Typhoon
 TL Ultralight TL-96 Star
 TL Ultralight TL-132 Condor
 TL Ultralight TL-232 Condor Plus
 TL Ultralight TL-232 Power Condor
 TL Ultralight TL-2000 StingCarbon
 TL Ultralight TL-2000 StingSport
 TL Ultralight TL-2000 Sting S3
 TL Ultralight TL-3000 Sirius
 TL-Ultralight Stream

References

Further reading

External links 

 List of aircraft (T)